Beedeville is a town in Jackson County, Arkansas, United States. The population was 107 at the 2010 census.

Geography
Beedeville is located at  (35.429727, -91.108572).

Demographics

As of the census of 2000, there were 105 people, 43 households, and 30 families residing in the town. The population density was 33.2/km2 (86.2/mi2). There were 58 housing units at an average density of 18.4/km2 (47.6/mi2). The racial makeup of the town was 95.24% White, 3.81% Black or African American and 0.95% Native American.

There were 43 households, out of which 39.5% had children under the age of 18 living with them, 60.5% were married couples living together, 2.3% had a female householder with no husband present, and 30.2% were non-families. 23.3% of all households were made up of individuals, and 9.3% had someone living alone who was 65 years of age or older. The average household size was 2.44 and the average family size was 2.83.

In the town, the population was spread out, with 29.5% under the age of 18, 7.6% from 18 to 24, 30.5% from 25 to 44, 19.0% from 45 to 64, and 13.3% who were 65 years of age or older. The median age was 34 years. For every 100 females, there were 101.9 males. For every 100 females age 18 and over, there were 111.4 males.

The median income for a household in the town was $34,375, and the median income for a family was $37,500. Males had a median income of $24,500 versus $11,607 for females. The per capita income for the town was $24,995. There were 15.4% of families and 10.9% of the population living below the poverty line, including 14.3% of under eighteens and 4.8% of those over 64.

Climate

The climate in this area is characterized by hot, humid summers and generally mild to cool winters.  According to the Köppen Climate Classification system, Beedeville has a humid subtropical climate, abbreviated "Cfa" on climate maps.

Education
Newport School District operates public schools. The Beedeville School District consolidated into the Newport School District on July 1, 1985.

References

External links
 Encyclopedia of Arkansas History & Culture entry

Towns in Jackson County, Arkansas
Towns in Arkansas